Blackfoot Mountain is located in the Lewis Range, Glacier National Park in the U.S. state of Montana. To the north of Blackfoot Mountain lies Blackfoot Glacier, one of the largest glaciers in the park. The stagnant Pumpelly Glacier is located to the immediate east and northeast of the mountain.

See also
 List of mountains and mountain ranges of Glacier National Park (U.S.)

References

Mountains of Flathead County, Montana
Mountains of Glacier National Park (U.S.)
Lewis Range
Mountains of Montana